Vinci (corporately styled VINCI) is a French concessions and construction company founded in 1899 as Société Générale d'Enterprises. Its head office is in Nanterre, in the western suburbs of Paris. Vinci is listed on Euronext's Paris stock exchange and is a member of the Euro Stoxx 50 index.

History
The company was founded by Alexandre Giros and Louis Loucheur as Société Générale d’Entreprises S.A. (SGE) in 1899. SGE was owned by Compagnie générale d'électricité (CGE), now Alcatel, from 1966 until 1981, when Saint-Gobain acquired a majority stake.

Companies acquired by SGE include Sogea (a civil engineering firm founded in 1878), bought in 1986, Campenon Bernard (a civil engineering and development firm founded in 1920), bought in 1988, and Norwest Holst (a British civil engineering firm founded in 1969 by the merger of Holst & Co, established in 1918, and Norwest Construction, established in 1923), bought in 1991.

In 1988, SGE was acquired by Compagnie générale des eaux, now Vivendi. In 2000, the company changed its name to Vinci.

In 2001, Vinci acquired Groupe GTM, which was a combination of Dumez, founded in 1880, and GTM, founded in 1891. In 2002, the UK business Norwest Holst was renamed Vinci plc.

The company went on to acquire Autoroutes du Sud de la France (the Southern Freeways Company) in 2006, and Bachy-Soletanche, the world's second-largest geotechnical specialist contractor (after Bauer) in February 2007. It also bought the UK operations of Taylor Woodrow Construction in September 2008.

Vinci acquired Cegelec, as well as the European aggregates businesses of Tarmac, in 2010 and it bought Meteor Parking from the Go-Ahead Group in September 2010. Then, in 2012, Vinci signed a deal to buy ANA Aeroportos de Portugal for €3,080 million.

In December 2013, Vinci was awarded a contract worth €440 million to build an express-lane highway system in Atlanta, Georgia. In 2014, Vinci sold 75% of the shares of Vinci Park to a consortium Ardian Infrastructure and Crédit Agricole Assurances. Vinci Park then became Indigo. In June 2016 Vinci sold the remaining 25.4% ex-Vinci Park shares to the consortium Ardian Infrastructure and Crédit Agricole Assurances.

Vinci and Orix won a 45-year contract in 2015 to operate Itami Airport and Kansai International Airport in Osaka Prefecture, Japan, at a price of around $18 billion.

In March 2017, the company invested in Brazil to operate the international airport at Salvador, Bahia for 30 years. In October 2017, Australian construction contractor Seymour Whyte was purchased. In November 2017, the company invested in Sweden to acquire Eitech and Infratek, specialists in electrical works and engineering.

In May 2019, Vinci acquired a 50.01% stake in Gatwick Airport.

On 7 April 2021, Vinci won the concession to operate for 30 years the following airports in Brazil: Manaus-Brig. Eduardo Gomes International Airport, Tabatinga International Airport, Tefé Airport, Rio Branco International Airport, Cruzeiro do Sul International Airport, Porto Velho-Gov. Jorge Teixeira de Oliveira International Airport, and Boa Vista International Airport.

On 31 December 2021, VINCI completed the acquisition of ACS’s energy business, Cobra IS.

Ownership
The breakdown of shareholders at 31 December 2019 is as follows:
 Institutional investors outside France: 57.2%
 Institutional investors inside France: 17.1%
 Individual shareholders – 6.8%
 Employees – 8.8%
 Qatar Investment Authority – 5%
 Treasury shares – 8.3%

Financial data

Source: VINCI

Competitors 

Source: VINCI Annual report 2016

Turnover analysis 
As of 2013, the turnover was split as follows:
 design and construction of works (35.5%): primarily in the building, civil engineering and hydraulics
 design, execution, and maintenance of energy and telecom infrastructures (26.5%; Vinci Energies);
 construction, renovation and upkeep of transport infrastructures (19.7%; Eurovia): roads, highways, and rail roads. The group is also active in urban design and granulate production (No. 1 in France);
 sub-contracted infrastructure management (16.3%; Vinci Concessions): primarily managing roads and highways (mainly through Autoroutes du Sud de la France and Cofiroute), airport activities;
 other (2%)

Net sales break down geographically as follows: France (58.9%), Europe (25.4%), North America (3.9%), Africa (3.5%) and other (8.3%).

In 2020, Vinci UK turnover was £858.5m, with pre-tax profit of £16.2m.

Notable projects
Vinci and its predecessor companies have been involved in many notable projects including: 
 Gariep Dam completed in 1971 
 Tour Montparnasse completed in 1972 
  Centre Georges Pompidou completed in 1977 
 Yamoussoukro Basilica completed in 1989 
 the new visitor entrance to the Louvre completed in 1989 
 Channel Tunnel completed in 1994 
 Pont de Normandie completed in 1995 
 Stade de France completed in 1998 
 Rio–Antirrio bridge completed in 2004 
 Whiston Hospital completed in 2013 
 Atlantic Bridge, Panama completed in 2019

Criticism
Vinci is involved in construction of the first 43 km of the Moscow-Saint Petersburg motorway through the valuable Khimki Forest. This construction has raised many protests in Russia, 75% of the local community – about 208,000 citizens of Khimki – oppose the project. There have also been numerous human rights abuses surrounding the project, with journalists and activists arrested and assaulted.

Vinci attracted protests in relation to its project to build an airport in Notre-Dame-des-Landes near Nantes, expected to become the third largest airport in France and being built on a site of 2,000 hectares of woodland and marsh with an acknowledged social and ecological value. This project was financed through a public-private partnership with profits going to Vinci. In November 2012, protests took place to prevent the expulsion of villagers and farmers who were struggling to protect their environment who were receiving support at both a national and international level.

Vinci's Norwest Holst and Taylor Woodrow were revealed as subscribers to the UK's Consulting Association, exposed in 2009 for operating an illegal construction industry blacklist. Vinci was later one of eight businesses involved in the 2014 launch of the Construction Workers Compensation Scheme, condemned as a "PR stunt" by the GMB union, and described by the Scottish Affairs Committee as "an act of bad faith".

References

External links

 

Construction and civil engineering companies of France
Companies based in Paris
Construction and civil engineering companies established in 1899
CAC 40
Companies listed on Euronext Paris
Companies in the Euro Stoxx 50
French companies established in 1899